Bernard Mensah (born 17 October 1994) is a Ghanaian footballer who plays as an attacking midfielder for Kayserispor.

Club career

Vitória Guimarães
Born in Accra, Bernard joined Vitória de Guimarães' youth setup in 2012, after starting it out at Feyenoord Ghana. He made his senior debuts with the reserves in the 2012–13 campaign, scoring nine goals and earning promotion to Segunda Liga.

On 4 July 2014 Bernard renewed his contract until 2018, being promoted to the main squad on the 18th. He made his professional – and Primeira Liga – debut on 16 August, starting and scoring his side's second in a 3–1 away win against Gil Vicente FC.

Seven days later, Bernard scored a brace in a 3–0 home success over FC Penafiel. His fourth league goal came on 14 September, netting through a penalty in a 1–1 draw against FC Porto also at the Estádio D. Afonso Henriques.

Bernard was linked to a possible move to Manchester United in May 2015, being also a target of Juventus and Valencia CF. He finished his first season in the Portuguese top flight with 30 appearances and five goals, with his side finishing fifth.

Atlético Madrid
On 22 July, Bernard moved to Atlético Madrid on a six-year deal, being immediately loaned out to fellow La Liga side Getafe CF for the 2015-16 season.

Vitória de Guimarães (loan)
On 18 August 2016, Mensah returned to Vitória de Guimarães on a season-long loan deal.

Kayserispor
Mensah spent the 2018/19 season at Kayserispor on loan from Atlético Madrid with an option to buy. He played a total of 28 games and scored four goals. Kayserispor redeemed Mensah's buying option in May 2019.

International career
On 8 June 2015, Mensah made his debut for Ghana in a match against Togo, scoring the only goal of the game.

Honours
Beşiktaş J.K.
Süper Lig: 2020–21
Türkiye Kupası: 2020–21

References

External links

1994 births
Living people
Footballers from Accra
Ghanaian footballers
Association football midfielders
Primeira Liga players
Vitória S.C. players
La Liga players
Atlético Madrid footballers
Getafe CF footballers
Kasımpaşa S.K. footballers
Kayserispor footballers
Beşiktaş J.K. footballers
Ghana international footballers
Ghanaian expatriate footballers
Ghanaian expatriate sportspeople in Portugal
Ghanaian expatriate sportspeople in Spain
Expatriate footballers in Portugal
Expatriate footballers in Spain
Süper Lig players